The 1972 South African Gazelles rugby union tour in Argentina was a series of matches played by the Gazelles (Under-24 South African selection) in Argentina, between September and November 1972.

It was the second tour of Argentina by this selection, after the 1966 tour and the fourth of a South African team.

The series between "Gazelles" and "Pumas" (Argentina national team) was tied with a victory for both. In fact, the second test played on 4 November was the first victory ever of a national team over a South African side.

Match summary 
Complete list of matches played by the South Africa u24 in Argentina:

 Test matches

Match details
Report of all the matches played by the Gazelles in Argentina:

San Isidro Club: J.Caballero; M.Walter, F.Ciro, R.Matarazzo, J.Otaola; F.G.Victorica, M.Cutler; R.Lucke, J.Cariacedo, M.Iglesias (capt.); J.Rodríguez Jurado, A.Anthony; F.Lafuente, O.Rocha, A.Orzábal.
Gazelles: R.Carlson; J.Germishuys, J.Jansen, J.Schlebusch, A.Swartz; J.Snyman, P.Bayvel; J.Verster; D.MacDonald, M.du Plessis; J.van Aswegen (capt.), K.de Klerk; J.Strauss, H.Reyneke, N.Bezuidenhout.

Sur: P.Peterson; P.Fasano, D.Guevara, J.C.Legorburu, M.Vila; T.Greig, M.Ritacop; J.Legorburu, O.Siepe, R.Dau; A.Subotta, A.Morbello; A.Borromel, D.López, C.Sozzani.
Gazelles: J.Snyman, C.Fourie, P.Cronje, F.du Toit, A.Swartz; D.Snyman, B.Borgen; M.Eloff, D.MacDonald, J.van Eyk, J.van Aswegen (capt.), J.Kritzinger, C.van Jaarsveld, A.Kruger, J.le Roux.

Mar del Plata: J.Viders; J.Prieto, C.Sosa, A.Uriaguereca, D.Fillippa; R.L ́Erario, R.Caparelli; R. Isabella, M.Riego, E.Feuillasier; D.Cordasco, W.Heath; C.Bonomo, N.Bosso, A.Bibbo.

Gazelles: C.Claasen, C.Fourie, P.Cronje, F.du Toit, J.Schlebusch, D.Snyman, P.Bayvel, J.Verster, M.du Plessis, M.Eloff, J.Kritzinger, K.de Klerk, N.Bezuidenhout, A.Kruger, J.Strauss.

Cuyo: E.Gandia; M.Brandi, R.Tarquini, O.Terranova (D.Muñiz), A: Dora; C: Navessi, L.Chacon; J.Nazassi, J.Navessi, J.P.Irrazabal; E.Sánchez, A.Cataneo; R.Iraneta, L.Ramos, R.Fariello.
Gazelles: R.Carlson, A.Read, P.Cronje, A.Swartz, C.Fourie, J.Snyman, B.Borgen, M.du Plessis, D.MacDonald, J.van Aswegen (capt.), K.de Klerk, J.Kritzinger, C.van Jaarsveld, A.Kruger, J.le Roux.

Córdoba: F.Mezquida; C.Antoraz, J.B.Martínez, R.Resella, G.Pispiero; R: Agüero, N.Trebucq; J.Aguad, J.Aguad, J.Peralta, C.Sosa; R.Pasaglia, J.Larson; R.P.Dun, H.Bianchi, A.Paz.
Gazelles: C.Claasen, J.Germishuys, F.du Toit, A.Read, J.Jansen, J.Snyman, P.Bayvel, J.van Aswegen (capt.), M.Eloff, J.Verster, K.de Klerk, J.Kritzinger, C.van Jaarsveld, H.Reyneke, J.Strauss.

Tucumán: J.Buccetto; J.Rojas, A.Fagalde, H.Navajas, C: Cisint; L.Castillo, C.Nieva; Bach, J.Ghiringheli (capt.), J.Veglia; O.Ferrari, J.Iramain; J.Maxud, R.Roldán, C.Bonanno.
Gazelles: R.Carlson, C.Fourie, P.Cronje, A.Read, A.Swartz, D.Snyman, P.Bayvel, J.van Aswegen, M.du Plessis, J.Verster; K.de Klerk, M.Eloff, N: Bezuidenhout, H.Reyneke, J.le Roux.

Salta: J.Eaton; H.Fernández Bravo, S.Pintos, H.Medina, M.Molina; G: Lamarca, R.Bordieu; J.Biasutti, G.Smith, O.Cardoso; L.Grand Jean, C.Fernández; M.Sánchez, E.Zancona, E.Araoz.
Gazelles: R.Carlson, J.Jansen, P.Cronje, F.Du Toit, G.Germishuys, D.Snyman, P.Bayvel, J.Verster, M.du Plessis, C.van Jaarsveld, K.de Klerk, J.Kritzinger, N.Bezuidenhout, H.Reyneke, J.le Roux (Eloff).

Argentina: D.Morgan; A.Altberg, R.Matarazzo, A.Travaglini, E.Morgan; H.Porta, A.Etchegaray (capt.); J.Whitman, H.Miguens, J.Cariacedo; J.Fernández, A.Anthony; F.Insúa, R.Handley, R.Foster.
Gazelles: R.Carlson, P.Cronje, F.Du Toit, A.Swartz, D.Snyman, P.Bayvel, J.van Aswegen(capt.), M.du Plessis, J.Verster; K.de Klerk, J.Kritzinger, N.Bezuidenhout, H.Reyneke, J.le Roux.

Santa Fe: E.Tenca; J.Trapaga, A.Caino, J.Rapela, C.Ibaquuer; J.Krezcam, A.Zilonka; A.Campanella, M.Celentano, O.Zitelli; P.Giardini, J.Sofredini; G.Abud, J.Tejerina, J.C.Colombo.
Gazelles: C.Claasen, J.Germishuys, A.Swartz, A.Read, C.Fourie, J.Snyman, P.Bayvel, J.van Aswegen (capt.), M.du Plessis, J.Verster, M.Eloff, J.Kritzinger; J.van Jaarsveld, A.Kruger, J.Strauss.

Buenos Aires: R.Espagnol; G.Pérez Leiros, L.Esteras, M.Dantilongue, A.Altberg; T.Harris Smith, L.Gradin (capt.); N.Carbone, M.Morgan, M.Iglesias; R: Castro, J: Virasoro; O.Carbone, J.Dumas, M.Carluccio.
Gazelles: R.Carlson, C.Fourie, F.Du Toit, J.Jansen, A.Swartz; J.Snyman, P.Bayvel, J.Verster, M.du Plessis, M.Eloff, K.de Klerk, J.Kritzinger, J.van Jaarsveld, H.Reyneke, J.le Roux.

Rosario: J.Uljich; C: García, G.Torneo, G.Seaton, A.Kniht, J.Escalante, R.Castagna; M.Chesta, M.Boaza, R.Imhoff; R.Suárez, M.Senatore; J.Gómez Keny, J.Constante, S.Furno.
Gazelles: R.Carlson, C.Fourie, P.Cronje, A.Read, J.Germishuys, J.Snyman, B.Borge,; M.Eloff, M.du Plessis, J.Verster; K.de Klerk, J.Kritzinger, J.van Jaarsveld, A.Kruger, J.Strauss.

Argentina: D.Morgan; A: Altberg, R.Matarazzo, A: Travaglini, E.Morgan; H.Porta, A.Etchegaray (capt.); J.Wittman, H.Miguens, J.Cariacedo; J.Fernández, A.Anthony; F.Insúa, R.Handley, R.Foster.
Gazelles: R.Carlson (J.Snyman), C.Fourie, P.Cronje, F.du Toit, A.Swartz; D.Snyman, B.Borgen, J.van Aswegen (capt.), M.du Plessis, J.Verster; K.de Klerk, J.Kritzinger, J.le Roux, H.Reyneke, J.van Jaarsveld.

Players' statistics

References 

South Africa
Gazelles
Rugby union tours of Argentina
Gazelles
South Africa national rugby union team tours